Tayfur Emre Yılmaz  (born 26 February 1989 in Babaeski) is a Turkish professional footballer who plays as a striker for Buca FK.

He formerly played for Malatyaspor, Sivasspor and Göztepe. Yılmaz appeared in nine TFF First League matches for Malatyaspor during the 2007-08 season.

References

1989 births
Living people
Turkish footballers
Göztepe S.K. footballers
Turkey youth international footballers
Association football forwards